Formula One sponsorship liveries have been used since the  season, replacing national colours. Major sponsors such as BP, Shell, and Firestone had pulled out of the sport ahead of the season, prompting the Fédération Internationale de l'Automobile to allow unrestricted sponsorship. At the 1968 South African Grand Prix, South African privateer team Team Gunston became the first Formula One team to implement sponsorship brands as a livery when they entered a private Brabham car painted in the colours of Gunston cigarettes for John Love. In the next race, the 1968 Spanish Grand Prix, Team Lotus became the first works team to follow this example, with Graham Hill's Lotus 49B entered in the red, gold and white colors of Imperial Tobacco's Gold Leaf brand. With rising costs in Formula One, sponsors becoming more important and thus liveries reflected the teams' sponsors.

Tobacco advertising was common in motorsport; as bans spread throughout the world, teams began using an alternate livery which alluded to the tobacco sponsor. At historical events, cars are allowed to use the livery which was used when the car was actively competing.

AGS

Alfa Romeo
Alfa Romeo was a Formula One constructor between 1950 and 1951, and again between 1979 and 1985. In 1950–1951 and 1979, the team used the rosso corsa (racing red) national color of Italy. In 1980, they switched to a livery sponsored by Philip Morris's Marlboro cigarette brand. In 1984, the Italian clothing brand Benetton took over Alfa Romeo's livery sponsorship, which they held until the withdrawal of Alfa Romeo from Formula One at the end of 1985. Alfa Romeo returned as a constructor in 2019 with the rebranding of the Sauber F1 Team and will pull out of the sport in 2023.

AlphaTauri
Toro Rosso was rebranded as Scuderia AlphaTauri in 2020 to promote Red Bull fashion brand AlphaTauri. Along with the rebrand, the team is no longer a junior team but a sister team to Red Bull Racing.

Alpine
Renault was rebranded as Alpine F1 Team in 2021 to promote Renault brand Alpine.

Andrea Moda

Arrows
Starting in the 1970s and going for decades until ending in mid-2002, Arrows, that was known as Footwork for a few years in the 1990s, had distinctive liveries, like the unusual Ruffles sponsorship in Footwork, an all-black car in the 1998 season, and an orange car in its final years.

Aston Martin
Aston Martin competed in Formula One in 1958-59 and re-entered in 2021.

ATS

Benetton
Benetton Formula Ltd. was a Formula One constructor that participated from 1986 to 2001. The team was owned by the Benetton family who run a worldwide chain of clothing stores of the same name. In 2000 the team was purchased by Renault, but competed as Benetton for the 2001 season. In 2002 the team became Renault F1. From the 1991 to 1993, Camel sponsored the Benetton team, but, from the 1994 to 2001 the main sponsor was Mild Seven.

BMS Scuderia Italia
In its Dallara years, Scuderia Italia raced with a livery slightly similar to Ferrari (rosso corsa with white details and black wings), but prior to the absorption by Minardi in 1993, when raced with Lola cars, had a white livery with red and yellow flames.

BMW Sauber
After having been an engine supplier in the 1980s and again since 2000, BMW entered Formula One with a works team of its own in 2006 after buying Sauber. The livery was based on the traditional BMW Motorsport team colours of white with light blue, dark blue and a little red (in an almost purple shade). White is also the original national racing colour of Germany, while white and blue are the colours of Bavaria and of BMW itself. On 27 November 2009, BMW agreed to sell the team back to its original founder, Peter Sauber.

Brabham
Prior to sponsorships, Brabham raced in turquoise with a gold band running across the car. This later changed to green and gold, the racing colours of Australia, as a mark of the nationality of the team's owner Jack Brabham. A Brabham car was the first Formula One car painted in the livery of a team's sponsor when Team Gunston as a privateer team entered a private Brabham car at the first race of the  season (the 1968 South African Grand Prix). In 1975 and 1976, Brabham received sponsorship from Martini; in 1976 the color scheme changed from white to red with light blue trim. The primary sponsor changed to Parmalat in 1978, with the cars retaining a variant of the same red and blue colors. With the team's switch to BMW engines in 1982, the new livery consisted of a clean dark blue and white with a stylized BMW "kidney grille" on the nose. This scheme was retained throughout the BMW years, even through a sponsorship change to Olivetti in 1984, until 1989. (This unusual representation of the engine supplier, specifically BMW, in the color scheme was revived by Williams when they debuted their own BMW cars in 2000.) In 1989, Brabham signed with Bioptron, a brand of Zepter International, which continued until the team was bought by Middlebridge Group. Since then, it was sponsored by many Japanese companies like Garage Italiya, a company that imports Italian cars in Japan, Autobacs, Nippon Shinpan, and Mitsukoshi. In its final season Brabham raced in blue and pink livery of the Japanese metal group Seikima-II.

Brawn GP
After Honda pulled out of F1 at the end of 2008, team boss Ross Brawn struggled to find a buyer to save the team, eventually buying it himself. A lack of sponsors resulted in the white livery, with flashes of bright yellow and black. Towards the end of the season, the team arranged one-race sponsor deals with a variety of major local companies, including Canon, Mapfre, Itaipava and Qtel.

Brawn GP dominated the early part of the 2009 season, with Jenson Button winning six of the first seven races. As other teams improved their cars, Brawn struggled for pace, but still recorded several podiums during the rest of the year. Their strong start and consistent finish was enough to secure the Constructors World Championship at the first (and only) attempt, as well as the drivers title with Jenson Button. At the end of the season, the team was purchased by engine supplier Mercedes-Benz.

British American Racing
British American Racing competed in Formula One from 1999 to 2005. The name was a reference to the team owner, British American Tobacco, hence the livery which included two of its main cigarette brands. In their debut season, the team wished to have its two cars painted in different liveries (one 555, the other Lucky Strike), but this was forbidden by the rules. So the team decided on a unique two-sided design, with the blue 555 livery of the right side of the car, and the red and white Luckies livery on the left and a zipper design on the middle. .

British Racing Motors

Caterham
It was formally from Malaysia but still had a livery dominated by British racing green, like the traditional Lotus livery for many years.

Coloni
In its first years, Coloni was sponsored by Himont and Montefluos, two subsidiary companies of Montedison

Ensign

Eifelland

EuroBrun

Ferrari
In keeping with their Italian roots, the Ferrari works team has always kept a red colour in the tradition of rosso corsa, the national racing colour of Italy, except for last two races in the  season (the 1964 United States Grand Prix and 1964 Mexican Grand Prix) when Enzo Ferrari let his cars be entered by the NART team in American national colours (white with blue lengthwise "Cunningham racing stripes") to protest against Italian racing authorities. However, Ferrari cars entered by non-Italian privateer teams wore their respective national racing colours until the 1961 Belgian Grand Prix when Belgian driver Olivier Gendebien privately entered a Ferrari car in the Belgian racing yellow colour. Over the years, rosso corsa has been combined with white parts and with various sponsorship schemes, but Ferrari has never fully let their cars be dominated by the sponsorship livery like many other teams have. This changed in the 1990s when Ferrari replaced their traditional rosso corsa colour with a "Marlboro red" which is noticeably lighter; this colour remains despite the ban on tobacco sponsorship. Philip Morris continued to sponsor Ferrari as Mission Winnow in 2018. Ferrari reverted back to its rosso corsa colors in 2022 after Philip Morris lost its livery sponsorship rights.

Fittipaldi

Fondmetal

Force India

Forti

Frank Williams Racing Cars

Haas
Haas entered Formula One in 2016.

Haas Lola

Hesketh

Hill
The Embassy Hill, founded by two-time World Champion Graham Hill, raced during the 1975 season with Imperial Tobacco's Embassy brand as title sponsor. The cars were predominantly white, with a red vertical stripe behind the cockpit. The team folded following the aircraft accident in which Hill, driver Tony Brise and four other team members were killed in November 1975.

Honda
Honda first raced in Formula One from 1964 to 1968. The cars were entered in an all-white livery with a red circle (duplicating the Japanese flag), the national racing colour of Japan. The company won two races but left F1 at the end of the 1968 season, before returning as an engine supplier in the 1980s. Honda in the 1990s never raced, but created prototypes like the RC100 and the RA099 tested at Suzuka Circuit.
After a decade away from the sport, Honda returned again as an engine supplier in 2001, before buying the British American Racing team and entering F1 as a constructor in 2006.
For the 2006 season, Honda continued with the BAT sponsorship with the Lucky Strike logo, but BAT pulled out for 2007. From 2007, the only logos on the car are the Honda badge, the Bridgestone logo, and the logo of Honda's environmental awareness program, Earth Dreams. For 2007, the livery itself was a picture of the Earth on a black background. For 2008, however, there are only pieces of the image of Earth on a mainly white background, as opposed to the whole of the Earth being on Honda's car.

HRT
The HRT Formula 1 Team competed for just three seasons, between 2010 and 2012. In that time, the team competed with three different liveries, this was due to a lack of sponsor continuity.

Jaguar
Jaguar used green to reflect its British nationality, just like British teams in the first decades of Formula One all used British racing green.

Jordan
Jordan Grand Prix competed in Formula One from –. In 1991 and  it featured green, the racing colour of Ireland. Between –, they were known for their distinctive bright yellow livery.

Larrousse

LEC
LEC was a Formula One team and constructor from the United Kingdom. They participated in ten Grands Prix, using a March in 1973. In 1977 they built their own car, the LEC CRP1.

Life

Ligier
Ligier always raced with the Bleu de France, the national racing colour of France, with red, black or white parts.

Lotus (1958–1994)
Lotus also had one of the longest sponsorship cooperations in Formula One history, making the black and gold of its John Player Special seasons (- and -) one of the best known liveries to this day.

Lotus (2010–2011)
The new Lotus team made its début in 2010 and was renamed to Caterham F1 in 2012. It was formally from Malaysia but still had a livery dominated by British racing green, like the old Lotus team had for many years.

Lotus (2012–2015)
The Renault team was renamed Lotus in 2012, following an agreement with Caterham F1. The team was owned by Luxembourg-based venture capital group Genii Capital and named after its branding partner Group Lotus. Its livery, introduced back in 2011 with Renault R31, was designed as a tribute to the Team Lotus cars of 1981–1986 and their famous John Player Special liveries.

Maki

Manor
Manor entered Formula One in 2016 after being renamed from Marussia.

March Engineering
In the mid-1970s, the works March team (March Engineering) often ran different sponsorship liveries on individual cars, under multiple entrant names.

Marussia
Marussia entered Formula One in  after Virgin Racing was renamed.

MasterCard Lola
Mastercard Lola folded after failing to qualify in the opening race.

Matra
Except for the Matra MS9 car, entered by the British Ken Tyrrell's privateer team Matra International in the British racing green at the first race of the  season (the 1968 South African Grand Prix), all Matra F1 cars entered by both the French works team Equipe Matra Sports (- and -) and the British privateer team Matra International (-) always kept the Bleu de France, the national racing colour of France.

McLaren
The first McLaren Formula One car raced at the 1966 Monaco Grand Prix was painted white with a green stripe to represent a fictional Yamura team in John Frankenheimer's film Grand Prix. McLaren and Marlboro had the longest sponsorship deal between a team and its title sponsor in F1 history which lasted for 23 consecutive seasons (–). McLaren then aligned with West (1997–2005) and Vodafone (2007–2013). In 2019, McLaren became the second Formula One team to sign a sponsorship deal with a tobacco company with British American Tobacco since Formula One banned tobacco advertising in 2006.

Mercedes-Benz
This was in the time before sponsorship liveries and the team was using an all silver livery, the national racing color of Germany.

Mercedes-Benz rejoined Formula One as a team in  after having purchased the Brawn GP team on 16 November 2009. On 21 December 2009 it signed a €30 million per season contract with Petronas as title sponsor. The blueish green livery color of Petronas is just present as fine lines at the side of the car, which overall is mainly painted in silver like historic Mercedes race cars of the 1930s and 1950s. To celebrate their 125th anniversary in motorsport, Mercedes-Benz decided to launch a special one-off livery for the 2019 German Grand Prix. The livery was a homage to the first racing cars that Mercedes made.

Merzario

Midland
Midland F1 competed for only one year, 2006. They took over Jordan in 2005, but Midland sold it in late 2006 to Spyker. They were the first F1 team to compete with a Russian license. (After Spyker's takeover in mid-2006, the team changed its livery to orange and name to Spyker MF1 Racing. In 2007, the team competed as Spyker F1.)

Minardi
As the longest lasting Formula 1 backrunners, Minardi had an enormous variety of sponsors during its 21 seasons, but still managed to have a predominantly black painted car most of the time.

Modena

Onyx

Osella

Pacific

Penske

Prost
Prost competed in Formula One for five seasons, with similar liveries in each season, despite changing sponsors.

RAM

Racing Point
Racing Point entered Formula One in 2019. For , the team was renamed Aston Martin.

Rebaque
Rebaque is the only Mexican team in F1 to date. Named after its driver Héctor Rebaque, it always raced with a brown and gold livery.

Red Bull Racing
Jaguar Racing was renamed Red Bull Racing after the former was bought from Ford on 15 November 2004 by the energy drink company. The deal with Sauber lasted until the end of the  season.

Since its first season in  the car livery did not change much, always keeping Red Bull as the main sponsor. This changed in 2013, when Infiniti became the team's title sponsor and Red Bull's branding on the car was reduced.

Red Bull have used special liveries on multiple occasions, supporting the release of upcoming films and company's charity program Wings for Life.

Renault
Renault competed as a constructor in Formula One in three different periods, from the 1977-1985, 2002-2011 and 2016-2020 seasons. Renault returned to Formula One in 2002 by buying the Benetton team. The team had a title contract with Mild Seven from 2002 to 2006, before switching to ING Group from the 2007 season to the 2009 Italian Grand Prix when ING withdrew all association with Renault. The team was sold and competed as Lotus from the 2012-2015 seasons, before Renault bought back the team and returned as a constructor in 2016.

Rial

Sauber
Sauber is a Swiss Formula One constructor that joined the Formula One grid in 1993. Sauber was bought by BMW at the end of the 2005 season and the team competed as BMW Sauber F1 Team from 2006 to 2009. On 27 November 2009, BMW agreed to sell the team back to its original founder, Peter Sauber. The 2010 season marked Sauber's return as an independent constructor. Sauber was rebranded and competed as Alfa Romeo Racing (later Alfa Romeo F1 Team) from 2019 to 2023 in a title sponsorship deal with Alfa Romeo. Sauber will compete as the Audi factory team in 2026.

Shadow

Simtek

Spirit

Spyker
Spyker took part in only one season of Formula One. The main colour of the car did not directly reflect the sponsorships but was the orange racing colour of the Netherlands.

Stewart
Stewart lasted for only 3 years before being bought out by its engine supplier, Ford, and being rebranded as Jaguar, but managed to win a race in its final season, 1999. Stewart had a tartan decoration on its cars to represent its Scottish nationality.

Super Aguri
Super Aguri was set up before the 2006 season by Aguri Suzuki, with the help of Honda Racing, to provide a drive for former Honda driver Takuma Sato. For the 2006 season's SA05 and SA06, their car was based on the 2002 Arrows A23, after which, for the 2007 and 2008 seasons, they ran cars based on the previous year's Honda chassis.

Surtees

Tecno

Toleman

Toro Rosso
Toro Rosso is the sister team of Red Bull Racing. Since it originated from the buyout of Minardi, its name means Red Bull in Italian. At the beginning, the team used to have the same name and sponsors as its parent team, with the major difference being the presence of a scarlet "charging bull" painted over the engine cowling.

Toyota

Theodore Racing

Trojan

Tyrrell
Tyrrell Racing competed in Formula One from –. Its traditional colour was blue and white, or a combination as such, for most of the 1970s and 1980s. The cars were more white during the mid to late 1990s.

Virgin
The Virgin Group's involvement with Formula One started in  when they decided to sponsor Brawn GP for that season. On 30 November 2009 it was reported that the Manor GP, one of the four newcomers teams for the  season, would be rebranded as Virgin Racing.

Williams
Williams, as a major constructor, is rare in modern F1 in that they have no manufacturer backing. Over the years, their supply of engines and other major components has often changed, meaning that their livery is renewed more often than most of their rivals. The BMW-engined Williams cars from 2001 to 2006 featured a dark blue and white scheme.

Wolf

Zakspeed

References

Formula One
Sports sponsorships
Liveries